Class war or class warfare often refers to:
 Class conflict, a conflict between socio-economic groups

Class war or class warfare may also refer to:

Print
 Class War, a UK anarchist newspaper and organisation
 Class Warfare, a 1996 book of interviews with Noam Chomsky
 Cla$$war, a comic book series by Rob Williams

Film and television
 Class Warfare (film), a 2001 USA TV movie directed by Richard Shepard

Music
 Class War (album), a 2007 album by Wisdom in Chains

See also 
 Class Struggle (disambiguation)
 "No War but the Class War", anti-capitalist motto